This is a list of Estonian television related events from 2005.

Events
5 February - Suntribe are selected to represent Estonia at the 2005 Eurovision Song Contest with their song "Let's Get Loud". They are selected to be the eleventh Estonian Eurovision entry during Eurolaul held at the ETV Studios in Tallinn.

Debuts

Television shows

1990s
Õnne 13 (1993–present)

Ending this year

Births

Deaths